Hermes

is a language for distributed programming
that was developed at IBM's Thomas J. Watson Research Center from 1986 through 1992,
with an open-source compiler and run-time system.
Hermes' primary features included:

 Language support of processes and interprocess communication.
 Compile-time verification that operations use initialized data.
 Representation-independent data aggregates called tables.
 Lack of pointers.

It used typestate analysis to check variables transitions errors, to rule out some semantically non meaningful transitions from one state to another (i.e. starting from a value, some sequences of operations on a variable are nonsensical), of which reading an uninitialized variable is a special case. In this role of compile-time checking of data initialization is similar to definite assignment analysis performed by Java, Cyclone and C#.

Hermes and its predecessor, NIL (Network Implementation Language), were the earliest programming languages supporting this form of initialization checking.
Typestate was actually used more extensively, to generate compiler-inserted "delete" operations.

References

Distributed computing
Programming languages
Static program analysis tools